The 2002 United States Senate election in Oregon was held on November 5, 2002. Incumbent Republican United States Senator Gordon Smith ran for re-election to a second term. Oregon Secretary of State Bill Bradbury emerged as the Democratic nominee, and though a competitive gubernatorial election occurred at the same time, Bradbury's campaign was never able to gain traction and Smith overwhelmingly won re-election (Bradbury only carried Multnomah County). , this is the last time the Republicans have won a U.S. Senate election in Oregon.

Democratic primary

Candidates 
 Bill Bradbury, Oregon Secretary of State
 Craig Hanson
 Greg Haven

Results

Republican primary 
 Gordon Smith, incumbent United States Senator

Results

General election

Campaign 
Smith, who had only served one term in the U.S. Senate, had slightly lower than a 50% approval rating before the summer of 2002 began. By July 2002, Smith had raised over $5 million, while Bradbury raised only about $1 million.

Predictions

Results

See also 
 2002 United States Senate elections

References 

Senate
Oregon
2002